Marcillac is an Appellation d'Origine Contrôlée for wine in South West France and is located 20 km to the north-west of Rodez in the Aveyron department. It is located close to the Lot river which flows into Garonne.

History

From Antiquity to the Middle Ages 
This wine-growing area developed under the auspices of the Abbey of Conques over a thousand years ago.

Modern period 
Initially a thriving business, wine production met the needs of the local population. The wines were held in high esteem by the middle classes and by the clergy of Rodez, whose superiors sited their country residence in the wine-growing area. They were also consumed by miners and agricultural workers. However, a public health crisis at the end of the 19th century, the frosts of the early 20th century and the decline of the mines combined to bring down wine production, and it reached its lowest point ever in 1965. It was at this point that a handful of producers decided to take action in order to prevent the wine industry from becoming completely extinct. In 1965 they decided to apply for VDQS status (Vin Délimité de Qualité Supérieure), i.e. the classification immediately below AOC wine, which it was granted under the name Vin de Marcillac. The growers re-landscaped the vineyards, creating terraces in order to allow maximum mechanisation of their work. In 1990 the wine-growing area was granted AOC status under its present name, Marcillac.

Geographical location 
This appellation is located to the north-west of Rodez in the Aveyron department.  Production is spread across the communes of Marcillac-Vallon, Balsac, Clairvaux-d'Aveyron, Goutrens, Mouret, Nauviale, Pruines, Salles-la-Source, Saint-Cyprien-sur-Dourdou, Saint-Christophe-Vallon and Valady.

Geology 
The vines are planted in red clay soils rich in iron oxide that are known locally as rougiers.  The individual plots either cling to steeply sloping hillsides or are cut into terraces.  Together they form a kind of amphitheatre that faces due south, ensuring that the grapes ripen well.

Climate 
The climate varies according to the season. In winter it is possible to detect the influence of semi-continental weather patterns, while in summer Mediterranean influences are more apparent. Approximate annual sunshine stands at an impressive 2,200 hours. More often than not, the winters are extremely harsh and the summers very hot and sunny, not dissimilar to those experienced by towns bordering the Mediterranean.

Temperatures for Rodez, which is located next door to the Marcillac wine-growing area:

Wine-growing area

Profile 
The wine is a red wine.

Grape varieties grown 
The main variety grown (90%) is Mansois, the local name for Fer Servadou. The remainder is made up of Cabernets: Cabernet Sauvignon and Cabernet Franc.

Terroir and wines 
This particular red wine tends to be light and fruity, with a predominantly raspberry aroma and is usually drunk within two years of vinification. For a more detailed guide to individual viniculteurs, see Paul Strang (2011) 'South-west France:the wines and winemakers'.

Types of wine and gastronomy 
Marcillac wine is locally often paired with aligot à la saucisse (potato puree mixed with melted cheese, cream and garlic, served with sausage) or tripoux (stuffed sheep's tripe), also with local cheeses such as Roquefort, Cantal, Laguiole, Salers and Rocamadour.

Notes and references 

South West France AOCs